Katarzyna Ewa Zdanowicz-Cyganiak (née ) (born in 1979) is a Polish poet and journalist.  Author of poetry volumes  (Improvisations and Not Only Those),  (Let's Get Acquainted),  (The She-collector),  (Enamel),  (How Do Little Girls Die?) and deadline. In 2004 she wrote a scholarly book about Maria Komornicka  (Who Is Afraid of Maria K.? Art and Exclusion). Her newest publication is the 30 September 2007 collection of 41 new poems in Polish titled deadline. As opposed to her earlier works, published under the authorship of Katarzyna Ewa Zdanowicz, this one was published under her married name as Katarzyna Zdanowicz-Cyganiak.

Some of her poems have been translated into English by Marek Ługowski and circulated and discussed on Usenet's rec.arts.poems. Her prepared 40-poem English-language debut is still awaiting a publisher.

External links
Katarzyna Ewa Zdanowicz' own website  (contains some English translations)
Her Polish poems at bar.art.pl 
Nine Katarzyna Ewa Zdanowicz poems translated by Marek Ługowski 

1979 births
Living people
Polish journalists
Polish women poets
Polish women journalists
University of Białystok alumni
21st-century Polish poets
21st-century Polish women writers
Artists from Białystok